

 
Anatye is a locality in the Northern Territory of Australia located in the territory's east adjoining the border with the state of Queensland about  south of the territory capital of Darwin.

The locality consists of the following land (from north to south, then west to east):
Lucy Creek and Manners Creek pastoral leases
Jervois and Tarlton Downs pastoral leases, the Anatye Aboriginal Land Trust (i.e. NT Portion 1815), and the Marqua and Tobermorey pastoral leases
The remainder of the land in the Anatye Aboriginal Land Trust.

The locality's boundaries and name were gazetted on 4 April 2007.  Its name is derived from the Anatye Aboriginal Land Trust which was established in 1991 initially in respect to land described as NT Portion 1815 located on the Plenty Highway and previously used as an “Animal Industry Branch research block.”

The 2016 Australian census which was conducted in August 2016 reports that Anatye had a population of 111 of which 62 (57.4%) identified as “Aboriginal and/or Torres Strait Islander people.”

Anatye is located within the federal division of Lingiari, the territory electoral division of Namatjira and the local government area of the Central Desert Region.

References

Populated places in the Northern Territory
Central Desert Region